The British Parking Association Limited (BPA), is a British-based trade association that focuses on the parking and traffic management fields. The association is a company limited by guarantee and non-profit organisation founded in 1968, although the limited company was not registered until 1970.

Description
The BPA is fully funded by its members rather than any independent source. The association's headquarters are in Haywards Heath, West Sussex. Parking News is its membership journal published eleven times a year for the BPA by Cambridge Publishers Ltd.

The association publishes a list of its members and asserts; there are currently 750 corporate members, which include manufacturers and suppliers, private car park operators, local authorities, health authorities, universities and colleges, airports, the privately owned railway operating companies, shopping centres, bailiffs, debt collectors and consultants. Members, whether from the private or public sectors, pay a subscription based on their parking revenues. The BPA also offers membership for individuals and Corporate Individual membership

Safer Parking Scheme 
The association manages the "Safer Parking Scheme" (formerly the Secured Car Parks Award) on behalf of the Association of Chief Police Officers (ACPO). The purpose of the scheme is to raise the standard of safety, security, design and operation of UK car parks.  Car parks that are found to meet the criteria set down by the scheme are awarded the Park Mark Safer Parking Award. The award is made after inspection by an accredited assessor and is subject to re-assessment every 2 years.

The Park Mark award may be granted to both council and privately operated car parks. In 2014 the Scheme celebrated its 10th Anniversary since becoming the Safer Parking Scheme.

Private parking enforcement 
Advice and guidance for motorists parking on private land can be found on various websites including the BPA, Know Your Parking Rights, Citizens Advice and POPLA. Website forums such as Pepipoo and moneysavingexpert also debate the issues.

Approved Operator Scheme and Code of Practice
The BPA's Approved Operator Scheme (AOS) launched in October 2007. The scheme is for BPA members that are involved in parking enforcement services on private land or in unregulated public car parks and was created after the DVLA announced it would only provide vehicle driver details to companies that joined an Accredited Trade Association. A condition of an ATA is that they have a Code of Practice in place. The BPA has been working with DVLA since their announcement, achieving ATA status and sharing all plans for the AOS with DVLA.

In complying with the Code, operators that are members of the AOS are able to demonstrate that their business operates to a set of standards and that it is recognised as an ostensibly professional and responsible member of the industry. However, if non-compliance to the Code is proven, it leads to sanctions being temporarily applied and could ultimately result in the member being suspended or expelled from the scheme.

Keeper liability 
As part of the Protection of Freedoms Act, keeper liability was introduced by Government on the proviso that the parking sector provided the motorist with an Independent Appeals Service (IAS) and that the service is funded by the sector. On public roads and regulated public car parks in most of England and Wales, and parts of Scotland where Civil Parking Enforcement operates, the law says that the owner is liable for any penalty charges regardless of who was driving. The owner is defined in those cases as being the Registered Keeper at the time of the contravention.

Parking on Private Land Appeals (POPLA)
The Parking on Private Land Appeals (POPLA) is the independent appeals service established by the BPA and initially operated by London Councils from October 2012 to September 2015. Ombudsman Services took over as the service provider for POPLA on 1 October 2015. The remit of POPLA to handle appeals by drivers and others wanting to challenge the issue of a parking charge notice issued by members of the BPA's Approved Operator Scheme on private land. POPLA only handles appeals after the recipient of the parking charge notice has been through the internal complaints procedures of the operator who issued the notice.

POPLA is available to all motorists who park on private land where parking is invited as well as locations where parking is not invited. POPLA is judicially independent when it comes to deciding the outcome of an appeal and their decision is binding on the operator only. The POPLA service is free to the motorist with the parking operator being charged a fee for every appeal that is considered. POPLA publishes an annual report which is available on its website.

At the official launch of POPLA, then Parliamentary Under Secretary of State for Transport Norman Baker welcomed the first annual report and the success of POPLA stating "This report shows that motorists are using this new free appeals service in significant numbers and, in more than half of cases, having their appeals upheld. This shows the new system is working for drivers and for the parking industry."

Parking (Code of Practice) Act 2019
In 2019 new legislation was passed when the Parking (Code of Practice) Act became part of the law. The BPA has consistently lobbied for change to introduce better regulation for the private parking sector. The Parking (Code of Practice) Act will bring in greater regulation of the private parking industry with a new independent appeals service, and all private parking operators will also have to follow a new industry backed Code of Practice. The Association set up the Approved Operator Scheme (AOS) in 2007 in response to concerns about the management of car parking on private land, an area of the parking profession in the United Kingdom which was at that time unlegislated. Members of the scheme are required to comply with the BPA's Code of Practice (CoP).

Parking Charge Notices
Private car parks are managed by a private parking company, these can be at train stations, retail parks, healthcare facilities, universities, private residential areas and railway stations to name a few. A private parking company can issue a Parking Charge Notice (parking ticket) when a vehicle appears not to be complying with the rules and regulations. To manage parking on private land the operator must belong to an Accredited Trade Association in order to access keeper details from the DVLA, but in order to do so must adhere to the scheme’s Code of Practice.

There are principles in contract law when applied to private parking, that the driver of a vehicle is invited by the parking operator (and/or the landowner) to park in a car parking site, and that the terms and conditions of the parking contract should be set out clearly and concisely through the placement of signs as upon entering and around the site. These are clearly specified in the BPA's Code of Practice for Parking on Private Land.

Operators do not have legal power to issue fines or penalties as a result of people parking on private land, as this is classed as misrepresentation of authority. They are able to issue a Parking Charge Notice (PCN) as specified in Schedule 4 of the Protection of Freedoms Act.

In parking at the site, a driver may have accepted those terms and conditions, provided they are clearly displayed, and the driver has read and understood them as set out in the case of Vine v London Borough of Waltham Forest [2000] EWCA Civ 106.

In his judgment, Lord Justice Roche stated:

In August 2010, the Coalition Government announced their intention to ban clamping on private land. The next two years saw the development and subsequent Royal Assent of the Protection of Freedoms Act which bans all forms of immobilisation without lawful authority.

The BPA welcomed the change as a move to marginalise rogue clampers, but felt that the legislation took away a valuable form of enforcement for landowners to use in the protection of their land. In order to ensure that private enforcement remained with a robust solution, the BPA's discussions with Government resulted in a form of keeper liability being introduced with the Protection of Freedoms Act, allowing the private operator in England and Wales to pursue the registered keeper of a vehicle if a named driver cannot be traced or denies liability.

Wheel clamping on private land was banned as of 1 October 2012 when the Protection of Freedoms Bill was passed into law.

On 10 July 2012, Martin Cutts of the Plain Language Commission made a speech at an event delivered by Landor Publishing "The Enforcement Summit '12" which was attended by some BPA executive members

In a speech made at Europe's largest parking event Parkex on 10 June 2014, Parliamentary Under Secretary of State for Transport Robert Goodwill praised the private parking sector by saying that industry self-regulation can succeed and that the establishment of POPLA, providing motorists with independent and free appeals is testament to the high standards that are often promoted by parking professionals, who are providing well designed, fair and proportionate parking services.

Media interest 
Media interest in the association has changed over time. Although members of the BPA have previously had their actions featured on the BBC Consumer Affairs Programme Watchdog, media interest on the private parking profession has decreased since the introduction of the BPA's Approved Operator Scheme and launch of POPLA. 
The BPA regularly contribute to TV and radio broadcasts when private parking is debated. Consumer help websites including MoneySavingExpert.com forums, Pepipoo, Consumer Action Group also provide their own opinion on the profession.

Combined Parking Solutions 
On 30 August 2012 Combined Parking Solutions (CPS) was suspended from accessing the DVLA database for three months.
The suspension was put in place as a result of CPS breaking the DVLA's rules on signage for privately issued parking tickets. The rules state(s) that parking companies must not make reference to liability by anyone other than the driver. On 14 June 2012, the DVLA sent a memo to the BPA about this issue and instructed them to put out a warning to their members. However, CPS was subsequently found to be in breach of this instruction on at least three separate occasions, and this resulted in their suspension. Being suspended from accessing the DVLA's registered keeper database will have a major effect upon how CPS operates. Private parking companies use this database to find out who the registered keeper is of vehicles they wish to issue a ticket to so that they can send out demands for payment. Without this data, they have no way of trying to chase payment where the driver has not identified themselves (e.g. via an appeal). Further to this, the DVLA has confirmed that CPS will not be able to retrospectively gather this data after the suspension ends or via another parking company. Furthermore, shortly before CPS was suspended, the British Parking Association had only just recently appointed a Combined Parking Solutions representative to the Board of its Approved Operator Scheme.  They continue to be represented on the AOS Board and no further issues have since been reported. Combined Parking Solutions ceased to be a member of the BPA in November 2014. As part of the BPA's new Governance, the AOS Board ceased to exist in 2014. Approved Operator Scheme members are now represented on the BPA's Council of Representatives.

References

External links 
 BPA website
 Know Your Parking Rights website
 Popla website
 Money Saving Expert's Parking Forums

Road transport in the United Kingdom
Parking
1968 establishments in the United Kingdom
Organizations established in 1968
Business organisations based in the United Kingdom
Transport organisations based in the United Kingdom